Libertarian Socialist Caucus may refer to:

 Libertarian Socialist Caucus, a left-libertarian caucus within the Libertarian Party
 Libertarian Socialist Caucus, a left-libertarian caucus within the Democratic Socialists of America

See also
 Factions in the Libertarian Party (United States)